Eugenia Martínez Vallejo (1674 – 1699) was a young woman from Spain who gained notoriety for her large size and weight, now thought to be the result of Prader–Willi Syndrome.

Biography 

Vallejo was born in the small village of Merindad de Montija, Burgos, Spain in 1674, to Antonia de la Bodega and José Martínez Vallejo. Her parents were poor, and her mother gave birth to her in a church after her water broke during mass.

As an infant, Vallejo had a decent appetite, and any initial weight gain was thought to have been a fortuitous sign, as both medical and aesthetic standards of the age considered slightly heavier frames on women to be preferable. By the time she was one year old, she had already reached a weight of 25 kg (55 lbs).

By the age of six, Vallejo already weighed 70 kg (155 lbs). News of her condition had spread to Madrid, and it was at this age that she was summoned there to the court of Spanish regent Charles II in 1680. So fascinated was the king by her appearance that he had his court painter, Juan Carreño de Miranda, a noted Baroque portraitist, create two full-body portraits of her: one clothed in formal dress and one nude. The paintings are titled The Monster - Dressed and The Monster - Nude respectively.

Within the court she fulfilled the functions of a jester, her appearance serving as a source of shock and amusement. This situation was not uncommon for people with significant physical deformities during this time. Many monarchs held disfigured and disabled people in the ranks of their courts, often exploiting  them for entertainment. Despite her presence in the court, there are no records of financial accommodation given to her, and so it is likely that she was only brought in during certain events as entertainment.

Martínez Vallejo died in 1699.

Legacy 

The two portraits by Carreño are currently held by the Museo del Prado in Madrid. In 1997, a sculpture by Amado González Hevia, also known as "Favila," was commissioned for the city of Avilés. He created a bronze statue of Vallejo, which stands on calle Carreño Miranda and is popular with tourists.

References 

1674 births
1699 deaths
Jesters
Spanish people with disabilities
Spanish courtiers
17th-century Spanish people